This is a list of Acer (maple) species cultivated in Denmark. Native species are marked in bold.

Acer aidzuense (A. ginnala var. aidzuense)
Acer argutum
Acer buergerianum
Acer caesium
Acer campestre
Acer capillipes
Acer cappadocicum
Acer carpinifolium
Acer caudatum var. ukurunduense (A. ukurundense)
Acer circinatum
Acer cissifolium
Acer x coriaceum 'Macrophyllum' (A. monspessulanum x A. pseudoplatanus)
Acer crataegifolium
Acer davidii Zone 6 - 9, not hardy  
Acer diabolicum
Acer gyraldiz
Acer glabrum
Acer glabrum var. douglasii
Acer granatense (A. opalus var. granatense)
Acer grandidentatum
Acer griseum
Acer grosseri
Acer grosseri var. hersii
Acer heldreichii
Acer henryi
Acer hyrcanum
Acer japonicum
Acer japonicum 'Aconitifolium' 
Acer leucoderme
Acer lobelii
Acer macrophyllum
Acer maximowicziana (A. nikoense)
Acer meyrii
Acer micranthum
Acer mono
Acer monspessulanum
Acer negundo
Acer negundo var. pseudocalifornicum
Acer negundo var. violaceum
Acer nigrum
Acer opalus
Acer opalus var. obtusatum (A. opalus ssp. obtusatum)
Acer opalus var. opulifolium (A. opalus ssp. obtusatum)
Acer opalus var. tomentosum
Acer palmatum
Acer palmatum var. amoenum
Acer palmatum var. matsumurae
Acer pensylvanicum
Acer platanoides
Acer pseudosieboldianum
Acer pseudoplatanus
Acer pseudoplatanus '''Prins Handjeri' Acer rufinerveAcer saccharinumAcer saccharinum 'Pyramidale'Acer saccharumAcer semenovii (A. tataricum ssp. semenovii)Acer shirasawanumAcer sieboldianumAcer spicatumAcer tataricumAcer tegmentosumAcer tenuifoliumAcer tetramerumAcer tetramerum var. betulifoliumAcer triflorumAcer truncatumAcer tschonoskiiAcer turkestanicumAcer ukurunduenseAcer velutinum''

Danish acers